West Plaza is a neighborhood in Kansas City, Missouri located just west of the Country Club Plaza district.  It is an eclectic urban neighborhood of single-family housing, small apartment buildings, and storefront businesses.  

The boundaries of the West Plaza are generally Westport Road (43rd) Street and Brush Creek on the north and south, and Madison Avenue and State Line Road on the east and west.

The housing stock dates to the early 20th century, with many bungalows, Kansas City shirtwaists, and brick apartment buildings. Inviting front porches are a common sight in the West Plaza. Teardowns have become a recent trend.

A commercial area along Westport Road on the neighborhood's northern boundary houses several restaurants, bars, and other businesses in historic brick store fronts.  Another commercial strip along 45th Street features a cluster of antique and houseware stores.

See also
List of neighborhoods in Kansas City, Missouri

References

Neighborhoods in Kansas City, Missouri